Rainier Beach High School is a public secondary school (grades 9-12) in the Seattle Public Schools system. It is located in the Rainier Beach area, in the southeastern part of the city of Seattle, Washington, United States. The school historically has had a strong emphasis on team sports, and many championship teams. The building has a capacity of 1,200 students, but enrollment has declined greatly in recent years. In 2006, 1,302 of the 1,600 high school students living in the Rainier Beach neighborhood traveled out of the area each morning to attend other high schools. In 2008–09, Rainier Beach began the year with 453 students and ended with about 295, giving an average monthly enrollment of 374. Sixty students chose it as their first choice. In 2013 the school began offering an International Baccalaureate program.

Academics
Advanced Placement classes are offered in mathematics, statistics, language arts, history/politics, music theory, and studio art. In 2008–09, 15% of Rainier Beach students took at least one AP class (about 75 students). Of these, 10% passed the AP exams (about 7 or 8 students).
Rainier Beach offers 17 ELL classes. Spanish and French are offered as foreign languages. There is an after school Arabic Languages program.
In 2009, over 61% of 10th grade students passed the state reading test, 17.6% passed the math test, and 6% met minimum standards in all three basic subjects - reading, writing and math. In 2009, 9.8% passed the science test, up from 3% in 2006.
On average, 76% of enrolled students attend school on any given day.  Of the class of 2009, 64.2% of entering freshmen, and 86% of entering senior class members (86 of 100), eventually graduated.
2009 42% of Graduating Class went on to 2yr or 4yr Colleges or Universities.
2010 57% of Graduating Class went on to 2yr or 4yr Colleges or Universities.  In fall 2010, 12 students from the 2010 graduating class enrolled at the University of Washington.

Athletics

Rainier Beach High School is a member of the Metro League, part of Sea-King District 2 and the Washington Interscholastic Activities Association.

In 2002, Rainier Beach's men's basketball team was ranked number 1 in the entire country  for a brief time. Rainier Beach has won the basketball state championship nine times. 1988, 1998, 2002, 2003, 2008, 2012, 2013, 2014, and 2016.

Demographics

As of October 2007, 59.8% of enrolled students were African American, 24.4% were Asian, 9.4% were Hispanic, 5% were White and 1.4% were Native American. Of the 361 students, 61.8% qualify for free or reduced lunch. These demographics reflect the neighborhood itself. In October 2009, 70.6% of students were eligible for free or reduced price meals. It is the only high school in the state of Washington where African-American students account for the majority of the student body.

Student life
Rainier Beach has a history of trying new things, beginning with its founding. Starting as a combined Middle and High School, the increased volume of students created the need to separate the two types of schools. Staff has been honored with the local Golden Apple awards. 2 Parents and leaders of the PTSA have been honored at the White House. 3 Along with program recognition (1998 Golden Apple Teaching Academy winner) a tight knit community which supports and develops close knit community relationships. 4 Much of the stigma of the Rainier Valley is often placed on the school, however the academics and the student successes are often over looked. Rainier Beach is trying to share their view of the school with their new approach, "The New Beach."  Promotion of their academic success is the new focus. 5 RBHS is in a troubled section of the city, and many incidents occurring in the area are automatically assumed to be caused by gang-affiliated young men, including Rainier Beach and South Lake Alternative High School students. Students come from many ethnic cultures within the neighborhood, and often from difficult socio-economic backgrounds. Sometimes the realities of society outside the school enter into school life. One recent example emerged in this newspaper story. Another larger incident erupted on the school grounds during the summer.

Performing Arts magnet school plan

A large new performing arts center was built on the campus in 1998, when Rainier Beach was to become a performing arts magnet school. Federal funding for the magnet plan, and the plan itself, ended after three years. Little used for years, the hall, now called the Paul Robeson Performing Arts Center, began hosting community theater productions in 2007. Rainier Beach now offers special programs in partnership with several theater troupes in the Rainier Beach High School Theater Coalition.

Principal controversy
During the 1990s, controversy grew at Rainier Beach as the school's academics worsened and enrollment declined. After years of complaints to the central administration, parents began picketing the school in 1999. They staged weekly demonstrations against principal Marta Cano-Hinz, who had led the school since 1993, demanding that the district fire her and turn Rainier Beach around. In January, 2000 Cano-Hinz announced that she would step down at the end of the school year. Later that year, the school district disclosed that it had paid $173,507 to induce her to resign.

In September, 2010 the school district appointed an academic co-principal, Lisa Escobar.

Improved academic standards
In the fall of 2005, the school district ended its practice of promoting high school students to the next grade even if they didn't pass their classes. The new policy required students to earn five credits in order to move to the next grade. In early 2006, before the 10th grade WASL test, nearly half of Rainier Beach's sophomores were reclassified as freshmen."It was a wake-up call," said new Rainier Beach principal Robert Gary, Jr.

In 2007, Rainier Beach sophomores met AYP (Annual Yearly Progress) due to an afterschool program funded by Nate Robinson.

Technology Access Foundation proposals
The Technology Access Foundation was invited to become a part of the Rainier Beach School in late 2006, but was met with a great deal of controversy regarding the possibility of a TAF takeover of the school. The foundation's co-founder Trish Millines Dziko outlined a proposal for how such a program would work, but despite administrative support, teachers and students were unhappy with the proposal. One of the major points for the opposition was TAF's ability to hire and fire teachers as they saw fit under the terms of the proposal. In addition, teachers and students felt like the proposal was a push to make Rainier Beach into a charter school. Supporters meanwhile, believed that it would create more incentives for people to enroll in the school, something that had been an issue for years. In the end, the proposal was rejected by the school board.

Proposed closure
In December, 2008 Superintendent Goodloe-Johnson proposed closing Rainier Beach High School and merging its students into Cleveland High School. Parents were not enthusiastic about the merger. Alumni from past decades recalled Rainier Beach's prior success in preparing students for college, and demanded that the district restore the school academically instead of closing it. Others were concerned that students' opposing gang affiliations in the two neighborhoods would cause violent clashes.
One week later, the Superintendent canceled the merger proposal.

Southeast Initiative
The Southeast Initiative was a three-year plan, from 2007 to 2009, to "[e]nsure that local secondary schools are the 'schools of choice' for residents in southeast Seattle..." The plan targeted Rainier Beach High School, Cleveland High School, and Aki Kurose Middle School. First approved in June, 2007, the district expanded the plan in 2008 and proposed to increase spending on it to $7.9 million. In 2007–08, the Initiative's first year, 17.3% of Rainier Beach students chose the school as their first choice. In the third year, 2009–10, only 12.8% chose it. Cleveland High School declined from 28.6% to 18.0% as its students' first choice. Aki Kurose Middle School declined from 33.3% to 19.4% as its students' first choice. Rainier Beach High School's WASL reading test pass rates declined from 70.0% in 2007 to 61.5% in 2009. Rainier Beach's math pass rates declined from 37.4% in 2007 to 17.6% in 2009. While some measures improved, many others remained more or less the same. In 2010, about four fifths of students living in Rainier Beach's enrollment area continue to enroll at other high schools, often in far away districts in the city.

International Baccalaureate
The school district, in the fall of 2010, discussed starting an International Baccalaureate program at Rainier Beach, in addition to the IB programs at Ingraham High School and Chief Sealth International High School. The plan was approved and classes began the fall of 2013. The IB Diploma program has been instituted and students and invested.

State designation as low achieving, eligibility for federal grant
On January 13, 2011, Washington State designated Rainier Beach High School as persistently low achieving. On the same day, Seattle Public Schools announced that the designation qualifies the school for remedial federal funds and that it intends to apply for a federal school improvement grant for Rainier Beach. To receive the improvement grant, the district must either close the school, replace the principal and at least half the faculty, or "transform" the school in several prescribed ways. Superintendent Goodloe-Johnson has announced that she will reassign the current co-principals and appoint a new principal at Rainier Beach.

Notable alumni

Ryan Anderson, current professional basketball player
Michael Berry, sprinter
Nissim Black, rapper
Doug Christie, former NBA basketball player (Los Angeles Lakers, New York Knicks, Toronto Raptors, Sacramento Kings, Orlando Magic, Dallas Mavericks, Los Angeles Clippers)
Ginnie Crawford (née Powell), professional track and field hurdler and two-time USA national champion
Jamal Crawford, NBA basketball player (Chicago Bulls, New York Knicks, Golden State Warriors, Atlanta Hawks, Los Angeles Clippers, Minnesota Timberwolves And Portland Trail Blazers; 2010, 2014, & 2016 6th Man of the Year)
Rosell Ellis, former professional basketball player
C. J. Giles, professional basketball player
Phil Heath, IFBB professional bodybuilder and Mr. Olympia
Dejounte Murray, NBA basketball player (Atlanta Hawks)
Nate Robinson, NBA basketball player (New York Knicks, Boston Celtics, Oklahoma City Thunder, Golden State Warriors, Chicago Bulls, Denver Nuggets); 2006, 2009, and 2010 NBA Slam Dunk Champion.
Lodrick Stewart, former basketball player in the NBA Development League and European professional teams.
Alameda Ta'amu, NFL football player, (Pittsburgh Steelers)
Terrence Williams, NBA basketball player, (New Jersey Nets, Houston Rockets, Sacramento Kings)
Saul Patu, NFL and AFL football player (New England Patriots, Tennessee Titans, Colorado Crush, and Columbus Destroyers)
Kevin Porter Jr., basketball player for the Houston Rockets.

Notes and references

External links

 Rainier Beach High School
 Rainier Beach High School history
 Seattle Public Schools
 Continuous School Improvement Plan Rainier Beach High School 2013-2015

High schools in King County, Washington
Seattle Public Schools
Public high schools in Washington (state)
Magnet schools in Washington (state)
John W. Maloney buildings
Rainier Beach, Seattle